Brown's Ferry, also known as the Mahone House, is a historic home near Courtland, Southampton County, Virginia. It was built about 1815, and is a large two-story, five-bay, Federal style brick dwelling. It has a one-story kitchen attached to the rear.  The main house has a side gable roof and three interior end chimneys. The interior features notable woodwork and painting. Also on the property are a contributing smokehouse, corn crib, and pole barn.  It was the birthplace of Confederate General William Mahone (1826–1895).

It was listed on the National Register of Historic Places in 1979.

References

Houses on the National Register of Historic Places in Virginia
Federal architecture in Virginia
Houses completed in 1815
Houses in Southampton County, Virginia
National Register of Historic Places in Southampton County, Virginia